Iowa Highway 202 (Iowa 202) is a short state highway in southern Iowa.  The route begins at the Missouri state line, where it continues as Missouri Route 202, and ends at Iowa Highway 2 north of Moulton.

Route description

Iowa Highway 202 begins in Fabius Township, in Davis County, at the Missouri state line just north of Coatsville, Missouri. It continues in Missouri as Route 202. For its first , it runs parallel to a former line of the Norfolk & Western railroad. Because of its proximity to the abandoned rail line, Iowa 202 follows an unusual path; heading northeast, turning north, and then turning northwest into Appanoose County. It continues to the northwest for  before going through an ess curve which points Iowa 202 to the north towards Moulton.

History
The section from Iowa Highway 2 to Moulton was designated in 1920 as Primary Road No. 71. In the 1926 Iowa highway renumbering, Primary Road No. 71 was renumbered as Iowa Highway 142 to avoid conflict with US 71. In 1938, Iowa 142 extended south to the Missouri state line. Iowa 142 was renumbered Iowa Highway 202 in the 1969 Iowa highway renumbering.  No changes to the route have occurred since its designation.

Major intersections

References

External links

202